Ramachandran Durairaj is an Indian actor who has appeared in Tamil language films. After working as an associate director, he made his breakthrough as an actor with a leading role in Suseenthiran's Naan Mahaan Alla (2010). He later won acclaim for playing a leading role in Gopi Nainar's Aramm (2017).

Career
Ramachandran moved to Chennai from Theni in 2000 and alongside his day job, he had a keen interest in photography. He became acquainted with director S. R. Prabhakaran and through their association, he became interested in working in the Tamil film industry as a cinematographer. He however began working as an assistant director in the television series Kolangal, and subsequently networked his way into appearing in acting roles in films. He briefly worked as Vijay Milton's assistant cinematographer in Vennila Kabadi Kuzhu (2009), before playing a key role in Suseenthiran's Naan Mahaan Alla (2010), as an antagonist. In 2014, Ramachandran appeared in two films which garnered him attention. Karthik Subbaraj's Jigarthanda and H. Vinoth's Sathuranga Vettai both saw the actor playing a henchman, who moves away from his violent personality.

His friendship with director Gopi Nainar meant that he was cast in the social drama film Aramm (2017), which had Nayanthara in the lead role. Ramachandran played the secondary lead character of a farmer whose daughter becomes stuck in an uncovered well, and paired opposite actress Sunu Lakshmi. The film won critical acclaim, with Ramachandran winning plaudits from critics for his performance.

Filmography

References

External links 
 

Indian male film actors
Male actors in Tamil cinema
Living people
21st-century Indian male actors
People from Tamil Nadu
Tamil male actors
1976 births